Amaranth is a township located in Dufferin County, Ontario, Canada, with a 2011 population of 3,963. It is named after the plant which grows abundantly within its borders. It is bordered by Mono to the east and East Luther to the west.

The hamlet of Laurel is located on the 5th Line (or County Road 12) and 10th Sideroad (or County Road 10). Laurelwoods Elementary School is located just outside this community, on the 6th Line and 10th Sideroad. The township building is also at this location, and has a park with baseball diamonds and soccer fields on its property.

Amaranth's system of naming roads is similar to that of the Dufferin County townships of Mono and Mulmur, and the Simcoe County townships of Adjala and Tosorontio. The system names roads running parallel to Highway 10 in Amaranth "Lines." Each is assigned a number from the town line westward in sequence. Roads running perpendicular to the Lines are numbered Sideroads, and are numbered using multiples of five ascending northward from County Road 109.

Communities
The township of Amaranth comprises a number of villages and hamlets, including the following communities such as Amaranth Station, Blacks Corners, Bowling Green, Campania, Crombie, Farmington, Fraxa, Jessopville, Laurel, Laurel Station, Maple Grove, Waldemar, Whittington; Bates' Corners, Coleridge, Fern Bank, Hall's Corners, Kennedy's Corners, Rich Hill, The Gore

Demographics 

Population trend:
 Population in 2011: 3,963
 Population in 2006: 3,845
 Population in 2001: 3,770 (or 3,736 when adjusted to 2006 boundary)
 Population in 1996: 3,450
 Population in 1991: 3,156

See also
 List of municipalities in Ontario
List of townships in Ontario

References

External links 

Lower-tier municipalities in Ontario
Municipalities in Dufferin County
Township municipalities in Ontario